Abbayitho Ammayi is a 2016 Indian Telugu-language film directed by Ramesh Varma. The film stars Naga Shourya and Palak Lalwani, with Brahmanandam, Rao Ramesh and Tamil actor Mohan playing supporting roles. The film was released on 1 January 2016 to mixed reviews. This film is the 999th movie of Ilaiyaraaja as a music director.

Plot
Abhi is a youth who wants to have fun in life. He is addicted to social networking sites and likes to flirt with girls. During his search, he befriends a simple girl. This is also the time when he falls for Prardhana and becomes close to her. But Abhi is caught in a compromising situation in Prardhana's house. Their families then disown them. Left clueless, Abhi abandons Pradhana. He is then surprised to discover that his online friend is none other than Prardhana. Abhi then toils to regain her love.

Cast

 Naga Shourya as Abhi
 Palak Lalwani as Prardhana
 Brahmanandam
 Mohan as Abhi's father
 Rao Ramesh as Prardhana's father
 Pragathi as Prardhana's mother
 Tulasi as Abhi's mother
 Praveen
 Prudhviraj
 Shakalaka Shankar
 Tejaswi Madiwada
 Lasya

Soundtrack 

Maestro Ilaiyaraaja scored the music, while lyrics were penned by Rehman, Chaitanya Varma and Sirasri.

Reception
The Hindu panned Abbayitho Ammayi, describing the leads' virtual relationship as "overdrawn, outdated and melodramatic." They also wrote that "Songs are good but the re-recording and background score leave a lot to be desired." Indiaglitz gave the film a rating of 3/5 stars, calling it as a coming-of-age love story with interesting plot and fair narration, appreciating Ilaiyaraaja' s music and good chemistry of lead pair Naga Shourya and Palak Lalwani. Venkat of Greatandhra gave 2.25/5 stars mentioning that the film is a big bore, except for visual quality and climax portions. He also blamed the silly story, outdated comedy and illogical sequences as the drawback of the film.

References

External links
 
 Official Website

Films scored by Ilaiyaraaja
2010s Telugu-language films
2016 films
2010s coming-of-age films
Indian coming-of-age films
Films directed by Ramesh Varma